Gustavo Selva (10 August 1926 – 16 March 2015) was an Italian journalist, writer and politician.

Born in Imola, Selva started his career as a journalist for the Bologna newspaper L'Avvenire d'Italia, for which he worked from 1946 to 1956. In 1960 he became a RAI employer, working as a newscaster and later being appointed director of the Radio 2 news programs and president of "RAI Corporation" in New York.

Selva started his political activity in 1984, as a Member of the European Parliament for the Christian Democratic party. He later adhered to the National Alliance  party, with whom he was a deputy for three legislatures and senator for one legislature.

References 

1926 births
2015 deaths
MEPs for Italy 1984–1989
People from Imola
Members of the Chamber of Deputies (Italy)
Members of the Senate of the Republic (Italy)
Christian Democracy (Italy) MEPs
National Alliance (Italy) politicians
Italian male non-fiction writers
Italian television journalists
Italian radio journalists